Inderscience Publishers is a global academic publisher based in Geneva, Switzerland.  It publishes approximately 428 peer-reviewed journals in the fields of science, engineering and technology; management, public and business administration; environment, ecological economics and sustainable development; computing, ICT and internet/web services.  All papers submitted to Inderscience journals are double-blind refereed. Conference papers can also be submitted for publication if the paper has been completely re-written and the author has cleared any existing copyrights.

Rankings
 
Inderscience has 247 journals indexed in Scopus and ranked by SCImago Journal Rank. The TOP 5 of these journals are: International Journal of Technology Management (est. 1986, h-index = 51); International Journal of Environment and Pollution (est. 1991, h-index = 41); International Journal of Mobile Communications (est. 2004, h-index = 38); International Journal of Vehicle Design (est. in 1979, h-index = 37) and International Journal of Bio-Inspired Computation (est. 2009, h-index = 33).

See also
 Academic journal
 Academic publishing
 Journal ranking
 Lists of academic journals
 Rankings of academic publishers
 Scholar Indices and Impact
 Scientific journal

References

Academic publishing companies
Publishing companies of Switzerland
Publishing companies established in 1979
Swiss companies established in 1979
Companies based in Geneva